Nightcliff is an electoral division of the Legislative Assembly in Australia's Northern Territory. It was first created in 1974, and takes its name from the suburb of the same name. Nightcliff is one of the smallest electorates in the Territory, covering only 4.28 km² and taking in the Darwin suburb of Nightcliff, most of Rapid Creek and a small area of Coconut Grove. There were 5,621 people enrolled in the electorate as of August 2020.

For most of the first quarter-century of its existence, Nightcliff was somewhat marginal, with incumbents generally holding the seat for several years. The seat's first member, independent Dawn Lawrie, was one of only two non-Country Liberal Party members in the first parliament.  Upon her retirement in 1983, it was taken by the CLP's Stephen Hatton, who later went on to become Chief Minister of the Territory. Hatton retired in 2001, and while Nightcliff was not a particularly safe CLP seat, it was widely expected that Hatton's son Jason would succeed him. However, he was unexpectedly defeated by Labor Party candidate Jane Aagaard on a large swing that, after preferences, made Nightcliff technically a safe Labor seat. Her victory was part of a Labor sweep of north Darwin that enabled the party to win government for the first time.

Aagaard served a controversial stint as Health Minister and was ultimately axed from the ministry altogether, which led some commentators to suggest that she was in danger of losing her seat at the 2005 election. Despite this, she had very little difficulty holding the seat amid the massive Labor wave that swept through the Territory; after preferences she actually picked up a healthy swing of 8.5 percent, with almost double the votes of the CLP challenger. She was subsequently installed as Speaker of the Northern Territory Legislative Assembly–the first Labor member to hold the post.

Aagaard retired in 2012, and despite a swing against Labor at that year's election, the seat was retained for Labor by Natasha Fyles. Labor's massive landslide at the 2016 election saw Fyles consolidate her hold on the seat; she picked up a healthy swing of 18 percent, ballooning her majority to 26.9 percent, making Nightcliff the safest seat in the Territory. She was reelected in 2020 with only a small swing against her; with a majority of 24.9 percent, Nightcliff is still the safest seat in the Territory.

Members for Nightcliff

Election results

References

External links
 Division profile from the Northern Territory Electoral Commission

Nightcliff